John Holloway Cushman (October 3, 1921 – November 8, 2017) was a lieutenant general in the United States Army.

Cushman was born in Tianjin, China while his father, Horace Oscar Cushman, was serving in the 15th Infantry.

He was a 1944 graduate of the United States Military Academy. While at West Point, Cushman played for the Army Black Knights men's soccer program, where he was named a second-team All-American in 1943.

In 1963 Colonel Cushman served as adviser to the Army of the Republic of Vietnam 23rd Division in the Mekong Delta.

He commanded the I Corps in the Western sector of Korea's Demilitarized Zone from 1976 to 1978. He also commanded the 101st Airborne Division from 1972 to 1973.

See also
 List of commanders of 101st Airborne Division

References

1921 births
2017 deaths
United States Army personnel of the Vietnam War
Army Black Knights men's soccer players
Association footballers not categorized by position
Recipients of the Distinguished Flying Cross (United States)
Recipients of the Distinguished Service Medal (US Army)
Recipients of the Legion of Merit
Recipients of the Silver Star
United States Army generals
American expatriates in China
American military personnel of World War II
Association football players not categorized by nationality